Document AI or Document Intelligence is a technology that uses natural language processing (NLP) and machine learning (ML) to train computers to simulate a human review of documents. 

NLP enables the computer to 'understand' the contents of documents, including the contextual nuances of the language within them, before extracting the information and insights contained in the documents. The technology can then categorize and organize the documents themselves.

Document AI is used to process and parse forms, tables, receipts, invoices, tax forms, contracts, loan agreements, financial reports, etc.

Key Features 
Document AI utilizes machine learning to extract information from documents in digital and print forms. Document AI is able to accurately identify text, characters, and images in different languages, thus enabling users to gain insights from unstructured documents. Using the data from the documents allows Document AI users to make better and faster decisions regarding the documents. The technology makes the process of analyzing documents more efficient by automating and validating the data for the workflows.

Common Uses 
 Freeing up employees for higher-value tasks.
 Using AI to check for anomalies in new invoices from old customers.
 Spotting fake currency and fraudulent checks.
 Fast-tracking the mortgage workflow process.
 Automating the monitoring of loan portfolios to manage credit risks.
 Enabling firms to automate the impact assessment of regulatory changes on their contracts.
 Analyzing previously inaccessible data siloed in documents to make informed business decisions.
 Streamlining the consumption of receipts on a worldwide scale.
 Increasing the reliability of business information by decreasing errors resulting from manual data entry.

References 

Enterprise software
Applications of artificial intelligence